Melisa diptera is a moth of the family Erebidae. It was described by Francis Walker in 1854. It is found in Cameroon, the Democratic Republic of the Congo, Equatorial Guinea, Gabon, Ghana, Ivory Coast and Nigeria.

References

 

Syntomini
Moths described in 1854
Erebid moths of Africa